UMT–Pădurea Verde is a district of Timișoara located near the Green Forest and the former Timișoara Mechanical Plants (abbreviated UMT). Founded in 1960 by the merger of two factories in the city, the Timișoara Mechanical Plants were bought in 2018 by Continental AG, a German multinational automotive manufacturer which has been operating since the early 2000s near the former industrial platform. The Banat Village Museum and the Zoological Garden are located in this district.

References 

Districts of Timișoara